DPSU may refer to:

 Dr Pepper/Seven Up, was a Plano, Texas-based soft-drink manufacturing company
 State Border Guard Service of Ukraine, the border guard of Ukraine